Alex Prentice KC is a leading Scottish lawyer.

He has held senior posts at the Crown Office and Procurator Fiscal Service, the body which normally carries out prosecutions in Scotland. He became an assistant Principal Advocate Depute in 2009, and then the Principal Advocate Depute. After a restructuring on 1 August 2011 he became the senior crown counsel.

He qualified as a solicitor in 1983 and as a Solicitor Advocate in 1994. He practised as a defence solicitor for 21 years. In 2004 he became the first Solicitor Advocate from outside the Crown Office and Procurator Fiscal Service to be appointed as an Advocate Depute. He was appointed as a Senior Advocate Depute in 2006 and became a QC in 2007.

He has prosecuted a number of significant cases including the shotgun murder at the "Marmion" public house in Edinburgh, the murder of Jolanta Bledaite, HM Advocate v Sheridan and Sheridan, the Murder of Surjit Singh Chhokar, and HM Advocate v Salmond. In 2012 he twice won a murder conviction without a body in the murder of Suzanne Pilley and the retrial in the murder of Arlene Fraser. Further to this, Prentice won an appeal lodged by Fraser in 2013. In June 2013, Channel 4 screened Nat Fraser's second trial in The Murder Trial, which heavily featured Prentice himself.

References

External links
article on his appointment
photograph

Living people
Scottish King's Counsel
Scottish solicitor advocates
Year of birth missing (living people)
Place of birth missing (living people)